The Bushmaster IV is a 40 mm chain-driven autocannon designed and built by Alliant Techsystems, based on the M242 Bushmaster, Bushmaster II and Bushmaster III. The Bushmaster IV fires 40×365mmR 3P (Prefragmented, Programmable, Proximity-fuzed), APFSDS-T Mk I, and APFSDS-T Mk II rounds. The 3P round will provide air burst capability and the APFSDS-T Mk II can penetrate armor with a thickness in excess of 150 millimeters.

Specifications 
The Bushmaster IV requires  at 24 volts to operate, fires from a cook off safe open bolt with absolute hangfire protection, and ejects forwards. The ammunition was originally developed for the Bofors 40mm L/70 cannon.

See also
 M230 30 mm autocannon
 M242 Bushmaster 25 mm chain gun
 Bushmaster II 30 mm chain gun
 Bushmaster III 35 mm chain gun
 Bofors 40 mm L/70

References

Autocannon
Vehicle weapons
40 mm artillery